Hellweg is an ancient east–west route through Germany.

Hellweg may also refer to:

 Hellweg Railway, Germany
 Hellweg Börde, Germany

People with the surname
 Eric Hellweg, American executive editor of Harvard Business Review online
 John H. Hellweg (1844-1931), American businessman and politician